Christian Langaard (5 August 1849 – 31 August 1922) was a Norwegian industrialist and art collector. He was born in Christiania as a son of brewery owner Mads Langaard and Lovise Jakobine Knudsen. He was married to Ellevine Ellefsen and was the father of Knut Christian Langaard and Johan Henrik Langaard.

Langaard assumed various leading positions in the brewery Frydenlund Bryggeri in Christiania. He was a dedicated art collector, and his collection was eventually donated to the National Gallery of Norway, the Norwegian Museum of Decorative Arts and Design and the Norwegian Museum of Cultural History. He was decorated Knight, First Class of the Order of St. Olav in 1904 and Commander, First Class in 1914.

References

1849 births
1922 deaths
Businesspeople from Oslo
Collectors from Oslo
Norwegian art collectors